Carste de Lagoa Santa Environmental Protection Area ( is a protected area in Minas Gerais, Brazil.

Location

It is administered by the Chico Mendes Institute for Biodiversity Conservation.
The objective is to protect biological diversity, manage the impact of human occupation and ensure the sustainable use of natural resources.
The area covers parts of the municipalities of Confins, Lagoa Santa, Matozinhos, Funilândia, Pedro Leopoldo and Prudente de Morais in Minas Gerais.

Conservation

The Carste de Lagoa Santa Environmental Protection Area is classed as IUCN protected area category V: protected landscape/seascape.
Protected species include fossorial giant rat (Kunsia fronto), ocelot  (Leopardus pardalis mitis) and orange-brown Atlantic tree-rat (Phyllomys brasiliensis).
It includes the Sumidouro State Park, which protects an area containing limestone caves where remains of early humans have been found.

Notes

Sources

Environmental protection areas of Brazil
Protected areas of Minas Gerais